Friends for Life is a 1987 album by Debby Boone.

The album was a success, peaking at #4 on the Top Contemporary Christian charts.

Track listing
 "Be Ye Glad" (Michael K. Blanchard) [4:17]
 "Make Me Ready" (Michael Omartian, Stormie Omartian) [5:00]
 "Unconditional Love" (Randy Goodrum) [4:58]
 "To Every Generation" (Bill Batstone) [5:38]
 "The Name Above All Names" (Chuck Girard) [4:46]
 "A Little Broken Bread" (Bill Batstone) [4:33]
 "Above All Else" (Michael Omartian, Stormie Omartian) [4:31]
 "Masihlanganeni (Let Us Stand Together)" (J.B. Arthur, Danny Bridgens, Nic Paton, Victor Phume) [5:01]
 "Friends for Life" (Michael Omartian, Stormie Omartian) [3:27]
 "Sincerely Yours" (Gary Chapman) [3:10]

Production credits
Engineers
Terry Christian
Dan Garcia
John Guess
Tom Perry
David Schober

Mixing
Terry Christian
John Guess
Bill Schnee

Mastering
Doug Sax

Synthesizer Programming
Erich Bulling

Design
Stan Evenson

Photography
Raul Vega

Acoustic Guitar
Bill Batstone
Dann Huff

Bass
Leland Sklar
Neil Stubenhaus

Drums
John Keane

Electric Guitar
Dann Huff

Percussion
Paulinho Da Costa

Piano
Michael Omartian

Synthesizer
Randy Goodrum
Rhett Lawrence
Michael Omartian

Background Vocals
Bill Batstone
Dara Lynn Bernard
Bill Champlin
Tamara Champlin
Billy Crockett
Chuck Girard
Randy Goodrum
Debbie McNeil
Gene Miller
Lisa Whelchel
Scott Wojahn

References

1987 albums
Debby Boone albums